is a station of the Seishin-Yamate Line of Kobe Municipal Subway in Kobe, Hyōgo, Japan. There are many education institutions and famous Japanese universities in the area. The institutions include Nissan Business School and Kobe Design University.

Railway stations in Hyōgo Prefecture
Stations of Kobe Municipal Subway
Railway stations in Japan opened in 1985